Pinlebu is a town in Katha District, Sagaing Division of Myanmar on the Mu River. It is the administrative seat of Pinlebu Township.  The town is connected by road to Phaungbyin, Kawlin, and Bamauk. Its inhabitants include the Kadu and Kanan ethnic minorities, and the region has witnessed fighting between the Communists and the government troops.

Climate

Notes

External links
Map of Sagaing Division Asterism
"Pinlebu Map — Satellite Images of Pinlebu" Maplandia.com

Township capitals of Myanmar
Populated places in Sagaing Region